Ordlegan (also Romanized as Ordlegān; also known as Ardīgān, Ardīkān, Ordīkān, and Urdīgān) is a village in Golzar Rural District, in the Central District of Bardsir County, Kerman Province, Iran. At the 2006 census, its population was 61, in 12 families.

References 

Populated places in Bardsir County